Matteo Sansone may refer to:

 Matteo Sansone (musicologist), Italian musicologist
 Matteo Sansone (archaeologist) (1916–1992), Italian archaeologist